Pistacia eurycarpa, commonly as Persian turpentine tree, is a species of Pistacia native to southeastern Turkey, northern Iraq, Iran, Armenia, and Antilebanon. It is called qezwan (قەزوان) or dareben (دارەبەن) in Kurdish. It is morphologically close to Pistacia atlantica subsp. mutica, but differs by having distinctly compressed fruits (width larger than length).

Having a watery flavour, its resin is used as a chewing gum to relieve upper abdominal discomfort, stomach aches, dyspepsia and peptic ulcer.

References 

eurycarpa
Flora of Turkey
Flora of Iran
Flora of Iraq